AFJ may refer to:
 Alliance of Fairness and Justice or Pan-Purple Coalition
 Alliance for Justice
 Armed Forces Journal
 Washington County Airport
 A Flying Jatt, a Bollywood movie